Georg "Schorsch" Volkert (28 November 1945 – 16 August 2020) was a German professional footballer. He played in 410 games in Bundesliga and scored 125 goals. He was also under contract in Switzerland, playing for FC Zürich.

A forward, Volkert won 12 caps for West Germany between 1968 and 1977. He scored two goals in his debut.

Honours 
1. FC Nürnberg
 Bundesliga: 1967–68

Hamburger SV
 UEFA Cup Winners' Cup: 1976–77
 DFB-Pokal: 1975–76

References

External links 
 
 
 
 

1945 births
2020 deaths
German footballers
Germany international footballers
1. FC Nürnberg players
FC Zürich players
Hamburger SV players
VfB Stuttgart players
Bundesliga players
Association football forwards
People from Ansbach
Sportspeople from Middle Franconia
Footballers from Bavaria
West German footballers
West German expatriate sportspeople in Switzerland
West German expatriate footballers
Expatriate footballers in Switzerland